Wrigley is an unincorporated community in Morgan County, Kentucky, United States. It lies along Route 7, north of the city of West Liberty, the county seat of Morgan County.  Its elevation is 817 feet (249 m), and it is located at  (38.0184184, -83.2712887).  It has a post office with the ZIP code 41477.

Landmarks
 Wrigley Falls - natural waterfall
 Wrigley Natural Bridge
 Wrigley Elementary School - constructed by WPA in 1936, now closed.

Climate
The climate in this area is characterized by relatively high temperatures and evenly distributed precipitation throughout the year.  
The Köppen Climate System describes the weather as humid subtropical, and uses the abbreviation Cfa.

References

Unincorporated communities in Morgan County, Kentucky
Unincorporated communities in Kentucky